1937 was the 44th season of County Championship cricket in England and resulted in a 19th championship success for Yorkshire. New Zealand were on tour and England won the Test series 1–0.

Honours
County Championship – Yorkshire
Minor Counties Championship – Lancashire II
Wisden – Tom Goddard, Joe Hardstaff, Leonard Hutton, Jim Parks senior, Eddie Paynter

Test series

England defeated New Zealand 1–0 with two matches drawn.

County Championship

Leading batsmen
 Wally Hammond topped the averages with 3252 runs @ 65.04
 Jim Parks senior achieved the unique double of 3000 runs and 100 wickets

Leading bowlers
Hedley Verity topped the averages with 202 wickets @ 15.68

References

Annual reviews
 Wisden Cricketers' Almanack 1938

External links
 CricketArchive – season summary

1937 in English cricket
English cricket seasons in the 20th century